Ch Muhammad Saqlain (born 1 November 1948) is a Pakistani politician associated with Pakistan Tehreek-e-Insaf. He is currently serving as PTI NA 66 candidate in Jhelum. He comes from a Jatt Tribe.

Biography
Ch Muhammad Saqlain son of Ch Dhuman Khan was born on November 1, 1948 in Jhelum. He graduated in 1971 from Government Degree College, Jhelum. He served as a Member, District council Jhelum during 1987-92; remained Member, Provincial Assembly of the Punjab during 1993-96 and 2002–07; he was also appointed as Parliamentary Secretary, Excise & Taxation during 1993-95 and as Advisor to Chief Minister Punjab during 1995-96. He was elected for the third term as Member, Provincial Assembly of the Punjab in general elections 2008 independently.

Political career
Chaudhary Muhammad Saqlain won PP-24, Jhelum in 2008 Pakistani general election as independent candidate.  After winning election he joined Pakistan Muslim League (N). In 2011 after Pakistan Tehreek-e-Insaf jalsa at lahore , he announced to join Imran Khan.  

He contested 2013 Pakistani general election unsuccessfully on Pakistan Tehreek-e-Insaf ticket from NA-66 (Jhelum-I). He obtained 62, 572 votes against Pakistan Muslim League (N)'s candidate Chaudhry Khadim Hussain. 

In 2016, Fawad Chaudhry joined PTI, he pursued party leadership to give ticket of 
NA-66 (Jhelum-I) to his cousin Chaudhry Farrukh Altaf. Chaudhary Muhammad Saqlain was offered provisional assembly seat PP-25 (Dina-Sohawa), he turned the offer down and contested 2018 Pakistani general election  from NA-66 (Jhelum-I) against Chaudhry Farrukh Altaf and NA-67 (Jhelum-II) against Fawad Chaudhry as an independent candidate. 

In  2018 Pakistani general election he stood fourth from NA-66 (Jhelum-I) obtaining 26,072	votes against Pakistan Tehreek-e-Insaf's candidate Chaudhry Farrukh Altaf. And in NA-67 (Jhelum-II) he obtained negligible votes.

References

1948 births
Living people